Silent Scandals is a 2009 Nigerian romantic drama film written and produced by Vivian Ejike and directed by T.K. Falope, It stars Genevieve Nnaji, Majid Michel, Chelsea Eze, Uche Jombo and Ebele Okaro-Onyiuke. Chelsea Eze won the Most Promising Actress category for her role in the film at the 6th Africa Movie Academy Awards.

Cast
Genevieve Nnaji as Jessie
Majid Michel as Neto
Chelsea Eze as Ella	
Uche Jombo as Muky
Ebele Okaro-Onyiuke as Mrs Helen Ubaka
Ime Bishop Umoh as Akpan
Pope Stan U. Ndu as Jay Jay
Isaac David as Alhaji Danladi
Peachman Akputa as Etim
Dami Solomon as Tonia
Tessy Oragwa as Tina
Oladimeji Alimi as Alhaji Aide
Kelechi Amadi Obi as Photographer

References

External links
 
 

2009 films
English-language Nigerian films
2009 romantic drama films
Films shot in Lagos
Films set in Lagos
Films set in Abuja
Nigerian romantic drama films
2000s English-language films